Sara Matthieu (born 21 May 1981) is a Belgian politician of Groen party who has been serving as a member of European Parliament for Belgium since 2020.

Political career
In 2020, Matthieu succeeded Petra De Sutter who had to resign her mandate as Member of the European Parliament to join the government of Prime Minister Alexander De Croo. In parliament, she has since been serving on the Committee on International Trade. In this capacity, she has been the parliament's co-rapporteur on minimum income.

In addition to her committee assignments, Matthieu is part of the parliament's delegation for relations with the countries of South Asia. She is also a member of the European Parliament Intergroup on LGBT Rights.

References

MEPs for Belgium 2019–2024
Groen (political party) politicians
21st-century Belgian politicians
Living people
1981 births